Werauhia viridis is a plant species in the genus Werauhia. This species is endemic to Costa Rica.

References

viridis
Endemic flora of Costa Rica